Brigitte Kren is an Austrian actress who has had leading roles in films and television shows. She participated in Dancing Stars (Austria season 7).

Films
Ant Street (1995) as Rosi Freitag 
Northern Skirts (1999) as Gitti
Slugs (2004 film)  as Anita
The Debt (2010 film) as Frau Bernhardt / Nurse 
Blood Glacier  as Minister Bodicek

TV series
Vier Frauen und ein Todesfall , Four Women and a Funeral, 2005 
Bettys Diagnose - 2017
SOKO Donau - 2018 

Freud 2020

References

External links
IMDB
ORF
filmmakers.de

Living people
Austrian film actresses
1954 births